Ravenstein or von Ravenstein is a German language habitational surname. Notable people with the name include:
 Apollonia van Ravenstein (1954), Dutch retired model and actress
 Ernst Georg Ravenstein (1834–1913), German-English geographer and cartographer
 Johann von Ravenstein (1889–1962), German general (generalleutnant) in the Wehrmacht

See also 
 Rabenstein

References 

German-language surnames
German toponymic surnames